BLAST Pro Series was an international Counter-Strike: Global Offensive tournament. The tournament brought together six teams in a shortened two-day tournament format. The event rotated locations in cities around the world. The Danish esports organisation, RFRSH Entertainment, created the tournament in 2017.

The tournament series was discontinued in favor of the league-style BLAST Premier, which began in early 2020.

Editions 

On December 1, 2019, the first BLAST Pro Series Global Finals took place in Bahrain, as the best four teams on their events along the year qualify for the 500,000 prize pool event.

Table key

References

External links 

Official website

2017 in esports
2017 Danish television series debuts
Sports competitions in Copenhagen
Esports television series
Counter-Strike competitions